Byambyn Tüvshinbat (born 27 March 1987 in Ulaanbaatar) is a Mongolian boxer. He competed in the 2007 and 2011 Asian Amateur Boxing Championships (winning silver in 2007 and bronze in 2011), the 2006 and 2010 Asian Games, the 2006 World University Boxing Championship and the Shaheed Benazir Bhutto International Boxing Tournament (where he won the Men's Light Welterweight tournament, defeating Mashhurbek Ruziyev of Uzbekistan). Tüvshinbat represented Mongolia in the Men's welterweight event at the 2012 Summer Olympics and defeated Gabonese Yannick Mitoumba in the first round but lost to Frenchman Alexis Vastine in the second round then in the 2016 Summer Olympics, beating Alberto Palmetta of Argentina in the first round and losing by split decision to Steven Donnelly in his second match.

References

External links
 

1987 births
Living people
Olympic boxers of Mongolia
Boxers at the 2012 Summer Olympics
Boxers at the 2016 Summer Olympics
Sportspeople from Ulaanbaatar
Boxers at the 2006 Asian Games
Boxers at the 2010 Asian Games
Boxers at the 2014 Asian Games
Mongolian male boxers
Universiade medalists in boxing
Universiade bronze medalists for Mongolia
Asian Games competitors for Mongolia
Welterweight boxers
Medalists at the 2013 Summer Universiade
20th-century Mongolian people
21st-century Mongolian people